Amblypneustes formosus is a species of sea urchin of the family Temnopleuridae. Their armour is covered with spines. It came from the genus Amblypneustes and lives in the sea. Amblypneustes formosus was first scientifically described in 1846 by Valenciennes.

References 

Amblypneustes
Animals described in 1846